The Scottish Highland Clan MacDonell of Glengarry is a branch of the Clan Donald. The clan chiefs of the Clan MacDonell of Glengarry were originally seated at Strome Castle but later moved to Invergarry Castle. The current chief of the Clan MacDonell of Glengarry is Patrick MacDonell, 24th Chief of MacDonell of Glengarry.
 
The following is a list of the chiefs who have headed the Clan MacDonell of Glengarry, they descend from the early chiefs of Clan Ranald and the high Clan Donald.

References

MacDonell of Glengarry